Federal Golf Club is a golf club in Australia. It is located in Red Hill, Australian Capital Territory. It was formed in 1932. It has hosted several notable golf tournament's.

References

External links

1933 establishments in Australia
Sports clubs established in 1933
Sports venues completed in 1933
Sporting clubs in Canberra
Golf clubs and courses in the Australian Capital Territory